The Bohemian crown jewels, also called the Czech crown jewels , include the Crown of Saint Wenceslas (Svatováclavská koruna), the royal orb and sceptre, the coronation vestments of the Kings of Bohemia, the gold reliquary cross, and St. Wenceslas' sword. They were originally held in Prague and Karlštejn Castle, designed in the 14th century by Matthias of Arras. Since 1791 they have been stored in St. Vitus Cathedral at Prague Castle. Reproductions of the jewels are permanently exhibited in the historical exposition at the former royal palace in the castle. The crown was made for the coronation of Charles IV in 1347, making it the fourth oldest in Europe.

Description

The crown has an unusual design, with vertical fleurs-de-lis standing at the front, back and sides. Made from 22-carat gold and a set of precious 19 sapphires, 30 emeralds, 44 spinels, 20 pearls, 1 ruby, 1 rubellite and 1 aquamarine, it weighs 2,475 g. At the top of the crown is the cross, which reportedly stores a thorn from Christ's crown of thorns. Unlike in most later crowns, the cross does not stand on a monde.

The Royal sceptre is made from 18-carat gold, 4 sapphires, 5 spinels and 62 pearls with an extra large spinel mounted on top of the sceptre; it weighs 1,013 g. The Royal orb is also made from 18-carat gold, 8 sapphires, 6 spinels and 31 pearls. It weighs 780 g and is decorated with wrought relief scenes from the Old Testament and the Book of Genesis. The Coronation robe was used from 1653 until 1836. It is made from precious silky red material called "zlatohlav" and is lined with ermine (fur of the stoat). The robe is stored separately from jewelry in a specially air conditioned repository.

For the coronation ceremonies, St. Wenceslas' sword, a typical Gothic weapon, was used. The first mention of the sword reported in historical records is in 1333, but the blade dates back to the 10th century, while the hilt is from the 13th century and textiles are probably from the time of Charles IV. The iron blade length is 76 cm, at the widest point is 45 mm and has a ripped hole in a cross shape (45 × 20 mm). The wooden handle is covered with yellow-brown fabric and velvet embroidered with the ornament of laurel twigs with thick silver thread. After coronation ceremonies, the sword was used for the purpose of granting knighthoods.

The oldest leather case for the crown was made for Charles IV in 1347. On top are inscribed four symbols: the Imperial eagle, Bohemian lion, the coat of arms of Arnošt of Pardubice and emblem of the Archbishopric of Prague.

The door to crown jewels chamber, and likewise the iron safe, is hardly accessible and has seven locks. There are seven holders of the keys: the President of the Republic, the Prime Minister, the Prague Archbishop, the Chairman of the House of Deputies, the Chairman of the Senate, the Dean of the Metropolitan Chapter of St. Vitus Cathedral and the Mayor of Prague, who must all convene to facilitate opening the impenetrable door and coffer.

History

The crown is named and dedicated after the Duke St. Wenceslaus of the Přemyslids dynasty of Bohemia. The jewels should be permanently stored in the chapel of St. Wenceslaus in St. Vitus. They were only lent to Kings, and only on the day of the coronation, and should be returned in the evening that day. After 1918 and the establishment of the Czechoslovak Republic the Coronation Jewels ceased to serve their original function, but remained important as symbols of national independence and statehood.

In the past, the Jewels were kept in different places, but have been always brought to royal coronations in Prague. Wenceslaus IV (1378–1419) probably moved them to Karlštejn Castle. They were then repeatedly moved for safety reasons: in the 17th century, they were returned to Prague Castle, during the Thirty Years' War (1631) they were sent to a parish church in České Budějovice, and then they were secretly taken to the Imperial Treasury, Vienna (1637). While the Jewels were stored in Vienna, the original gold orb and sceptre from the 14th century were replaced with current ones. The new orb and sceptre probably originated with an order by Ferdinand I in 1533. Possible reasons for this replacement might be that the originals were simply too austere, and lacked any precious stones. Deemed unrepresentative of the prestige of the Kingdom of Bohemia, it made sense to replace them with an orb and sceptre in an ornate, jeweled style that resembled the crown.

The Jewels were brought back to Prague on the occasion of the coronation of Bohemian king Leopold II in 1791. At that time, the current tradition of seven keys was established, though the holders of the keys in the course of time were changed according to political and administrative structures. The jewels were kept in Vienna due to the threat from the Prussian Army, but were later returned to Prague, arriving in the city on 28 August 1867.

According to the ancient tradition and regulations laid down by Charles the Fourth in the 14th century, the Jewels are exhibited only to mark special occasions. Exhibitions can take place only at the Prague Castle. In the 20th century there were nine such moments in history. The President of the Republic has the exclusive right to decide on the display of the crown jewels.

An ancient Czech legend says that any usurper who places the crown on his head is doomed to die within a year. This legend is supported by a rumor that Reinhard Heydrich, the Nazi governor of the puppet state Protectorate of Bohemia and Moravia secretly wore them, and was assassinated less than a year later by the Czech resistance.

Gallery

Exhibitions

List of crowned Bohemian kings and queens 
If not mentioned coronation was held in Prague.

Kings and queens crowned with the Crown of Saint Wenceslas (and other crown jewels):

See also
Crown jewels

References

External links

The Bohemian Crown Jewels – Prague Castle website

Crowns (headgear)
Crown jewels
National symbols of Austria-Hungary
National Cultural Monuments of the Czech Republic